is a major publisher in Japan.

Takeshobo was founded in 1972 by Kyōichirō Noguchi, starting Japan's first Mahjong magazine . Other magazines, such as a magazine dedicated to mahjong-themed manga, as well as a magazine dedicated to yonkoma manga, were published. Furthermore, a mahjong museum was founded. Currently, in addition to the older magazines, a pachinko magazine, a gravure magazine, short stories as well as adult literature novels are published. On the Internet, it has distribution agreements with Livedoor. Takeshobo yonkoma comics are distributed on the comic distribution website Manga Life Win. Excluding mahjong manga, manga series are published under the Bamboo Comics label.

Magazines

External links
 Official homepage (Japanese)

 
Book publishing companies in Tokyo
Magazine publishing companies in Tokyo
Mass media companies based in Tokyo
Manga distributors
Comic book publishing companies in Tokyo
Publishing companies established in 1972
1972 establishments in Japan